The 1903 Kilkenny Senior Hurling Championship was the 15th staging of the Kilkenny Senior Hurling Championship since its establishment by the Kilkenny County Board.

On 29 May 1904, Threecastles won the championship after a 2-10 to 0-05 defeat of Kilmanagh in the first final replay. This was their second championship title overall and their first title in five championship seasons.

Results

Final

References

Kilkenny Senior Hurling Championship
Kilkenny Senior Hurling Championship